San Juan Zitlaltepec is a town of Zumpango, in the state of Mexico State, north of Mexico Valley. The name Zitlaltepec comes from Náhuatl meaning mountain of the star.

References

Populated places in the State of Mexico
Populated places in the Teotlalpan
Zumpango
Otomi settlements
Nahua settlements